Kim Sae-rom (born 2 October 1987) is a South Korean television personality, model and actress.

Personal life 
She married chef Lee Chan-o on August 13, 2015. After about a year and four months after marriage, the reason for the divorce was known to be a difference in personality. They became completely separate in January 2017.

Television

Variety shows

Awards and nominations

References

External links 
 

1987 births
Living people
South Korean television presenters
South Korean women television presenters
South Korean female models
South Korean television actresses